Boo to a Goose is a 1996 children's picture book by Australian author Mem Fox, and illustrated by David Miller. In this book, published by Hodder and Stoughton Children's Books, a boy states twelve nonsensical things he would rather do than say "boo to a goose".

Publication history
 1998, USA, Dial Books for Young Readers 
 1996, Australia, Hodder Children's Books

Reception
Kirkus Reviews called it "in words and art, a delightful mix of nonsense and verve", and Booklist found it ".. a series of silly rhyming fantasies gorgeously illustrated with dramatic cut-paper collages".

Boo to a Goose has also been reviewed by the following publications:
School Library Journal, and The Horn Book Magazine.

Notes

References

External links
 Library holdings of Boo to a Goose

Australian picture books
1996 children's books
Picture books by Mem Fox
Nonsense poetry
Books by Mem Fox